The FA County Youth Cup is a football competition run by The Football Association in England. It was launched in the 1944–45 season to provide young players who had not yet signed with a professional club, even on a scholarship basis, with competitive representative football.

Each County Football Association provides a team made up of school or league players affiliated to the County Association that are under 18.

History

Finals

†–After extra time
‡–After penalties

References

External links 
Page at the FA Website

Youth football cup competitions in England